Faith Assembly Church was a multi-church sect headquartered in Wilmot, Indiana, founded in 1973 by Rev. Hobart Freeman. The group had associated groups across Indiana, Ohio, Illinois, Tennessee, and Kentucky. They called their church building a "glory barn". During the 1980s they had 2,000 members. The church emphasized divine healing and taught that medicine was evil. By 1983, at least 91 of its members, mostly children, had died as a result of refusing medical treatment. Multiple investigations were launched and ultimately Freeman was indicted on charges relating to the death of a 15-year-old in the congregation in October, 1984. Freeman had proclaimed his belief that he would not die because of his faith in his teachings. Freeman died in December 1984 at age 64 after refusing medical treatment for a personal illness.

References

External links
 Handbook for Religion and Health

Buildings and structures in Elkhart, Indiana
Sects